Dorymyrmex brunneus is a species of ant in the genus Dorymyrmex. Described by Forel in 1908, the species is endemic to several nations in South America.

References

Dorymyrmex
Hymenoptera of South America
Insects described in 1908